Sandeep Singh Patel, also known as Sandeep Singh is a politician of Samajwadi Party who is currently the Member of the Uttar Pradesh Legislative Assembly from Meja of Prayagraj district.
 As a Samajwadi party candidate, he defeated BJP candidate and sitting MLA Neelam Karwariya by 3441 votes in the 2022 Uttar Pradesh Legislative Assembly election.

References

Living people
Samajwadi Party politicians from Uttar Pradesh
Uttar Pradesh MLAs 2022–2027